In mathematics, KR-theory is a variant of topological K-theory defined for spaces with an involution.

Definition
A real space is a defined to be a topological space with an involution. A real vector bundle over a real space X is defined to be a complex vector bundle E over X that is also a real space, such that the natural maps from E to X and from C×E to E commute with the involution, where the involution acts as complex conjugation on C. (This differs from the notion of a complex vector bundle in the category of Z/2Z spaces, where the involution acts trivially on C.)

The group KR(X) is the Grothendieck group of finite-dimensional real vector bundles over the real space X.

Periodicity
Similarly to Bott periodicity, the periodicity theorem for KR states that KRp,q = KRp+1,q+1, where KRp,q is suspension with respect to Rp,q =
Rq + iRp (with a switch in the order of p and q), given by

and Bp,q, Sp,q are the unit ball and sphere  in Rp,q.

References

K-theory